The 111 Brigade is a formation of the Sri Lanka Army. The Brigade is responsible for the defense of the City of Kandy and the central province at large. It was formerly known as the Area Headquarters Kandy and was renamed in 2011 coming under the 11th Division.

It traces its roots to the Central Commander's Headquarters which was established in 1972 following the 1971 Insurrection under the command of Colonel E.J Divitotawela. In 1988, it was renamed as the 12 Division followed with another re-designation in 32 Division until it became known as the Area Headquarters on 23 October 1996.

Current formation 
 1st Battalion, Sri Lanka Rifle Corps 
 2nd Battalion, Sri Lanka Rifle Corps

See also
11th Division

References

External links
Area Headquarters Kandy Becomes 111 Brigade Headquarters

1972 establishments in Sri Lanka
Brigades of the Sri Lanka Army
Kandy
Military units and formations established in 1972